Daqiao is a town in Binyang County, Guangxi, China. , it has 1 residential community and 16 villages under its administration.

See also 
 List of township-level divisions of Guangxi

References 

Towns of Guangxi
Binyang County